Stereotypes of Canadians include actual or imagined characteristics of Canadians used by people who view Canadians as a single and homogeneous group.

Common stereotypes

Maple syrup

About 80% of the world's maple syrup is produced in Canada, with the nation exporting C$487 million (about US$360 million) in 2016. Quebec produces the largest maple syrup, accounting for 90 percent of this total.

Maple products have become strongly associated with Canada and are commonly sold in tourist shops and airports as souvenirs from Canada. The sugar maple's leaf is featured on the Canadian flag.

Hockey
Hockey is Canada's most popular winter sport and the nation's official winter sport. The Stanley Cup, considered the premiere trophy in professional ice hockey, originated in Canada in 1893. The National Hockey League, established in Canada in 1917, contains seven teams from Canada: the Calgary Flames, Edmonton Oilers, Montreal Canadiens, Ottawa Senators, Toronto Maple Leafs, Vancouver Canucks, and the Winnipeg Jets.

Cold weather
Due to Canada's proximity to the Arctic, the nation's climate is often associated with snow and cold temperatures. The village of Snag, Yukon boasts the coldest temperature recorded in North America at −63.0 °C (−81.4 °F).

Politeness
Similar to the British and Japanese, Canadians are often associated with good manners. Canadians are also often ridiculed for excessively apologizing.

Cuisine
Common foods and drinks associated with Canada include maple syrup, poutine, peameal bacon, Kraft dinner, ketchup-flavored potato chips, and Canadian beer. In addition, the Canadian coffeehouse and restaurant chain Tim Horton's is considered a Canadian cultural icon.

References

Ethnic and racial stereotypes
Cultural depictions of Canadian people
Canadian culture